is a station on the Yurikamome Line in Minato, Tokyo, Japan. It is numbered "U-07".

Station layout
The station consists of an elevated island platform.

Platforms

History
Daiba Station opened on 1 November 1995.

Surrounding area
A Hilton hotel, a Grand Nikko hotel, and AQUA CiTY ODAIBA mall are located near the station.

References

External links

 Official information site

Railway stations in Tokyo
Yurikamome
Railway stations in Japan opened in 1995